Chrysoula Argyros (born 19 March 1954) is a South African artist who paints in watercolors and oils. Chrysoula's chosen subjects are generally portraits, Greek scenes, old buildings and people.

She joined the Watercolor Society of South Africa in 1991 and achieved associateship in 1993 and higher associateship in 2005, and has received many awards from the society. Chrysoula was commissioned to do a painting for former President F.W. De Klerk in 1994. She joined the Miniature Art Society of South Africa in 1992 and has received numerous awards.

She was invited to be an associate member of Miniature Painters, Sculptors & Gravers Society in 2006. Membership into this society is by invitation, through a vote of members of the society. Chrysoula was elected in 2007 into Miniature Artists of America as a signature member. The Miniature Artists of America was established to honour outstanding practitioners in the field of miniaturism. Candidates are selected from among consistent award winners in major miniature art exhibitions. She was elected in 2012 as an associate member of the Hilliard Society in the UK. She was also elected in 2013 as an associate member of the Royal Miniature Society in the UK.

History
Chrysoula was born on the Greek island of Limnos and immigrated with her family to South Africa in 1956. She completed high school at General Smuts High School in Vereeniging with Art as one of her subjects. Chrysoula started to paint in 1982 under the guidance of Sheila Santilhano and later in 1998 with Hazel Thompson.

Awards and achievements

Miniature Art Society of South Africa
highly commended awards for:
 1998: At the Exhibition in Knysna
 1998: At the NBS-House and Garden Show in Durban
 2001: “Quiet Corner”
 2002: “Balcony in Tuscany”
 2003: “Exchange Views”
 2004: “Sitting Pretty”
 2005: “Summer Colours”
 2006: “Tide”
 2006: “Old Cypriot Woman”
 2007: “Monk from Mount Athos”
 2008: “Monk from Ayion-Oros”
 2009: “Yia-Sou, Cheers”
 2010: “Villager”
 2011: “Burning the Candle”
 2012: “Village Priest” 2013: “Broken Shutter”
 2013: 1st Prize for Stamp challenge - “Old Greek Villager”

Watercolour Society of South Africa
highly commended awards for:
 1994: “Old Peasant” (49th Open)
 1994: “MacCauvlei” (49th Open)
 1998: “Kotsina-Limnos” (59th Open)
 1999: “Blue Window” (62nd Open)
 2001: “La Ramblas” (63rd Open)
 2002: “Paul” (67th Open)
 2002: “Woman in Black” (68th Open)
 2005: “Old Athenian” (73rd Open)
 2005: “The Monk” (74th Open)
 2007: “Gavito” (78th Open)
 2009: “Potted Geraniums” (82nd Open)
 2009: “The Visitor” (82nd Open)
 2010: “The Villager” (84th Open)
 2013: “Old Greek Fisherman” (89th Open)

1991: Joined the society, had three works accepted for the exhibition in Hong Kong.
2004: Grand Prix Exhibition was awarded First and Second Prize.

Brush & Chisel Society
 1992: W H Coetzer Award - Best Painting
 1996: W H Coetzer Award - Highest Points
 2004: Award for Highest Points scored - Watercolour
 2004: Award for Highest Points scored - Overall

Miniature Art Society of Florida
 2002: Honourable Mention for “Yia-Yias’ Pretty Pots”
 2003: First Place for “Villager from Rhodes”
 2004: Third Place for “All in a Row”
 2006: Third Place for “Waiting”
 2008: Honourable Mention for “Entangled Creeper”
 2009: Honourable Mention for “Outside Looking In”
 2010: Second Place for “Potted Geraniums” (Botanical and Floral)
 2011: First Place for “Neighbours” (Transparent Watercolours)
 2012: Second Place for “Village Garden” (Transparent Watercolours)
 2013: Second Place for “Green Shutters” (Exterior)

Miniature Painters, Sculptors and Gravers Society
 2009: First Place for “At the End of a Day” (International)
 2010: Second Place for “The Villager” (Portrait)
 2011: First Place for “Old Greek Monk” (Portrait)
 2012: Second Place “Sorting Herbs” (International)
 2012: Third Place for “Old Greek Fisherman” (Portrait)

Miniatures in Mariposa (Sierra Artists Gallery - USA)
 2006: Peoples Choice - First Prize for “Old Cypriot Woman”
 2006: Honourable Mention for “The Tailor”
 2007: Second Prize for “Tshabalala” (Portrait)
 2007: Second Prize for “Colourburst” (Floral)
 2007: Honourable Mention for “Green Gate”
 2008: Second Prize for “At the End of a Day” (Portrait)
 2011: First Prize for “Vanishing Traditions” (Portrait)
 2011: Third Prize for “Greek Priest” (Portrait)
 2012: First Prize for “Old Greek Villager” (Portrait)
 2012: Third Prize for “Creative Monk” (Portrait)
 2013: First Prize for “Old Greek Fisherman” (Portrait)
 2013: Honourable Mention for a portrait
 2014: First Prize for "Broken gate" (Landscape)
 2014: second Prize for "Solitude" (Portrait)

Vereeniging Art Society
 1988: Best Watercolour on Show
 1988: Best Building or Street Scene
 1989: Best Watercolour on Show
 1989: Best Building or Street Scene
 1989: Best Oil Landscape
 1989: Best Oil on Show
 1990: Best Watercolour Landscape
 1990: Best Portrait
 1990: Best Building or Street Scene
 1990: Best Watercolour on Show
 1991: Best Oil Landscape
 1991: Best Portrait
 1991: Best Building or Street Scene
 1991: Best Interior
 1991: Best Still Life
 1991: Best in Open Category
 1991: Best Oil on Show
 1991: Best Watercolour on Show
 1992: Best Miniature on Show
 1992: Best Oil Flowers
 1992: Best Oil Landscape
 1992: Best Still Life
 1992: Best Portrait

Other Awards, Achievements and Commissions
 Commissioned to do a painting for the former President of South Africa, President F W De Klerk, which was presented to him in January 1994.
 Commissioned to do 6 paintings for a calendar in 1994 and again in 1998.
 Commissioned to do paintings for the Bank of Athens in Johannesburg in 1999.
 Commissioned to do 8 portraits of past Archbishops and Patriarchs of the Greek Orthodox Church of Africa.
 Received “Merit Award” at the 39th Annual Lake Oswega Festival of Arts in 2002.
 Received “Excellence Award” in the Field of Art from The Lyceum Club of Greek Woman in 2005.
 Received “Higher Associateship” from the Watercolour Society of South Africa.
 Work was accepted for the World Federation of Miniatures at the:
 First World Miniature Art Exhibition in the UK in 1996.
 Second World Miniature Art Exhibition in Tasmania in 2000.
 Third World Miniature Art Exhibition in Washington, USA in 2004.
 Fourth World Miniature Art Exhibition in Tasmania in 2007: Received “Highly Commended” for Best Portrait on Show in Any Medium.
 Fifth World Miniature Art Exhibition in Moscow, Russia in 2004.
 Awarded “Signature Membership” by the Hilliard Society of Miniatures in the UK in 2012.
 Elected “Associate Member” of the Royal Miniature Society in the UK in 2013.
 A painting was purchased as a gift for the Deputy President of South Africa, Kgalema Mohlanthe, at a function (which he was a guest of honour) to celebrate Advocate George Bizos’ 85th Birthday.

References

https://web.archive.org/web/20120104192631/http://www.miniatureartistsofamerica.org/maa_bio_chrysoula_argyros.html
http://www.miniatureartistsofamerica.org/book.html
http://miniatureartsocietyofsa.co.za/?page_id=6
http://www.mpsgs.org/MPSGS-Exhib.htm
https://web.archive.org/web/20131111143307/http://www.royal-miniature-society.org.uk/Society_News.html
https://web.archive.org/web/20131111140001/http://www.royal-miniature-society.org.uk/Members.html

1954 births
Living people
20th-century South African women artists
21st-century South African women artists
South African painters